David Díaz (born 6 September 1964) is a Venezuelan former basketball player who competed in the 1992 Summer Olympics. Díaz played collegiately for Houston.

References

1964 births
Living people
Houston Cougars men's basketball players
Basketball players at the 1992 Summer Olympics
Olympic basketball players of Venezuela
Venezuelan expatriate basketball people in the United States
Venezuelan men's basketball players
1990 FIBA World Championship players
20th-century Venezuelan people
21st-century Venezuelan people